Spilarctia oberthueri is a moth in the family Erebidae. It was described by Georg Semper in 1899. It is found in the Philippines and possibly on Sulawesi.

References

Moths described in 1899
oberthueri